This is a comprehensive discography of Blind Lemon Jefferson, who was an East Texas–born and Chicago-based Texas blues musician. He recorded 79 singles from 1925 to 1929. Jefferson was notable among blues musicians of his time for recording both spiritual and secular music, and he recorded both blues and ragtime songs.

Singles

Spiritual singles

1926 Blues singles

1927 Blues singles

1928 Blues singles

1929 Blues singles

References
Complete Recorded Works, vols. 1–4. Document Records 5020, 5021, 5022, 5023.
The Complete Recorded Sides. JSP Records JSP7706 (4-CD box).
Too Late, Too Late Blues, vol. 1. Document Records DOCD-5150 (two alternate takes).

Discographies of American artists
Blues discographies